The 2008 congressional elections in Nebraska were held on November 4, 2008 to determine who would represent the state of Nebraska in the United States House of Representatives, coinciding with the presidential and senatorial elections. Representatives are elected for two-year terms; those elected will serve in the 111th Congress from January 3, 2009 until January 3, 2011.

Nebraska has three seats in the House, apportioned according to the 2000 United States Census. Its 2007-2008 congressional delegation consisted of three Republicans.  No district changed hands, although CQ Politics had forecasted district 2 to be at some risk for the incumbent party.

The party primary elections were held May 13.

Match-up summary

Overview

District 1

This district encompassed most of the eastern quarter of the state. Republican incumbent Jeff Fortenberry (campaign website) won re-election. Max Yashirin (campaign website) was the Democratic nominee. CQ Politics forecasted the race as 'Safe Republican'.
Race ranking and details from CQ Politics
Campaign contributions from OpenSecrets

Results

District 2

This district encompassed the core of the Omaha metropolitan area. Republican incumbent Lee Terry won against Democratic nominee Jim Esch, an Omaha businessman. CQ Politics forecasted the race as 'Leans Republican'. The Cook Political Report ranked it 'Republican Toss Up'. The Rothenberg Political Report rated it 'Toss-Up/Tilt Democratic'.

While campaigning, Terry had pledged that he would serve no more than three two year terms. However, he announced just months later that he would break the pledge. This garnered some bad press, but he won three more terms with little trouble. However, in 2006, he won by 55% to 45%, much less than expected in a solidly Republican district. His Democratic opponent in that race, Jim Esch, faced him again in 2008. 
Lee Terry (R) - Incumbent (campaign website)
Jim Esch (D) (campaign website)
Race ranking and details from CQ Politics
Campaign contributions from OpenSecrets

Results

District 3

This district encompassed the western three-fourths of the state. Republican incumbent Adrian Smith (campaign website) won against Democratic nominee Jay C. Stoddard (campaign website). CQ Politics forecasted the race as 'Safe Republican'.
Race ranking and details from CQ Politics
Campaign contributions from OpenSecrets

Results

References
Specific

General
 2008 Competitive House Race Chart The Cook Political Report, October 30, 2008.
 2008 House Ratings The Rothenberg Political Report, November 2, 2008

External links
2008 Elections from the Nebraska Secretary of State
U.S. Congress candidates for Nebraska at Project Vote Smart
Nebraska U.S. House Races from 2008 Race Tracker
Campaign contributions for Nebraska congressional races from OpenSecrets

2008
Nebraska
United States House of Representatives